Bohemian Bicycles, also known as Bohemian Custom Bicycles is a bicycle manufacturer and framebuilding school in Tucson, Arizona.  It makes handmade steel lugged frames.  David Bohm started the business in 1994 and expanded to framebuilding in 2006. It has since received recognition from the North American Handmade Bicycle Association.

References

External links
 Bohemian Bicycles

Cycle manufacturers of the United States
Companies based in Tucson, Arizona
Mountain bike manufacturers